The following list includes notable people who were born or have lived in Springfield, Illinois. For a similar list organized alphabetically by last name, see the category page People from Springfield, Illinois.

Arts and culture 

 Adrian Belew, musician best known for solo career song "Oh Daddy" and work with King Crimson, the Talking Heads, and the Tom Tom Club; lived in Springfield during the 1980s
 June Christy, cool jazz singer with The Stan Kenton Orchestra
 Morris Day, musician and actor best known for work with Morris Day and the Time and Purple Rain, born in Springfield
 Vachel Lindsay, poet, considered the father of modern singing poetry, wrote first book of film criticism, The Art of the Moving Picture, in 1915 
 Sarah Danielle Madison, actress in Training Day, Jurassic Park III, 90210, 7th Heaven, Judging Amy
 Jay Manuel, reality show host, America's Next Top Model
 Bobby McFerrin, musician best known for song "Don't Worry, Be Happy", attended Sangamon State University (now UIS) in 1975, son of opera baritone singer Bobby McFerrin Sr.
 Brendon Small, sitcom writer, producer, actor, and musician
 Louise Stanley, early 20th-century actress, born in Springfield
 Cecily Strong, cast member of Saturday Night Live, born in Springfield
 Bobby Watson, early 20th-century actor, born in Springfield
 Theodore Lorch, early 20th-century actor, widely seen in Three Stooges shorts, born in Springfield
 Douglas Berry, actor, producer, pilot, born in Springfield, Illinois

Business and Institutional Leadership 

 Marsha J. Evans, CEO of American Red Cross and US Navy Admiral
C.W. Post, businessman and founder of Postum Cereal Company
Marjorie Merriweather Post, businesswoman, founder of General Foods Corporation, and leader in developing the frozen food market. One of her four marriages was to Edward Francis Hutton, founder of E.F. Hutton.
Julius Rosenwald, President and Chairman of Sears, Roebuck and Co. and important philanthropist. Rosenwald was born in Springfield in 1862. He attended public schools and lived in Springfield until 1879. His philanthropy included establishing the Rosenwald Fund which was noted for donations to African American education and YMCAs. Rosenwald played a leading role in the creation of the Museum of Science and Industry.

Politics and law 

 John Peter Altgeld, Governor of Illinois from 1893 to January 1897, best known for role in Haymarket Affair pardons, the Pullman Strike and 1896 Democratic National Convention 
 Stanley P. V. Arnold, Illinois state representative and newspaper editor
 William W. Billson, Minnesota state senator and lawyer
 Stephen Arnold Douglas, Register of Federal Land Office, Springfield, 1837–1840; Illinois Secretary of State, 1840–41, associate justice of Illinois Supreme Court, 1841–1843; U.S. Representative, 1843; U.S. Senator, 1847 until death June 3, 1861; Democratic Presidential Candidate, 1860
John Porter East (1931–1986), U.S. senator from North Carolina (1981–1986) 
 D. Logan Giffin (1890–1980). Illinois state legislator and lawyer.
 Ulysses S. Grant (1822–1885), 18th President of the United States of America, stationed in Springfield at the outbreak of the American Civil War
 John Hay, statesman, diplomat, author, journalist, and private secretary and assistant to Abraham Lincoln, grandfather of Ambassador John Hay Whitney 
 William H. Herndon, law partner and biographer of Abraham Lincoln
 William Brown Ide (1796–1852), Vermont State Legislator, central figure in California's Bear Flag Revolt of 1846, named President of the Republic of California 
 William Jayne, first governor of the Dakota Territory, personal friend of Abraham Lincoln 
 Otto Kerner, Jr., Governor of Illinois (1961 to 1968). Son-in-law of Anton Cermak, Kerner led the National Advisory Commission on Civil Disorders, the Kerner Commission. He was convicted of corruption.
 John L. Lewis, president of the United Mine Workers of America (1920 to 1960)
 Abraham Lincoln, 16th President of the United States of America
 Mary Todd Lincoln, First Lady of the United States, wife of Abraham Lincoln, died in Springfield in 1882
 Robert Todd Lincoln, U.S. Secretary of War and son of Abraham Lincoln, born in Springfield
 David T. Littler, Illinois state legislator and lawyer
 Tracey Meares, Walton Hale Hamilton Professor of Law at Yale Law School and was appointed by President Barack Obama for the President's Task Force on 21st Century Policing
 Dana Perino, White House Press Secretary for the George W. Bush administration, reporter for WCIA and earned MA in Public Affairs Reporting from the University of Illinois Springfield (UIS)
 Frank P. Sadler, Illinois state senator and lawyer, born in Springfield 
 Paul Simon, U.S. Senator and Presidential candidate, served in the Illinois State legislature from 1955 to 1968, served as Illinois Lt. Governor from 1969 to 1973, taught at Sangamon State University (now UIS) from 1973 to 1975  Father of Illinois Lt. Governor Sheila Simon.
 Adlai Stevenson, 31st Governor of Illinois, Democratic Party's nominee for president in 1952 and 1956
 Helen J. Stewart, "first lady of Las Vegas"
 Sharon Tyndale, Illinois Secretary of State
 Brand Whitlock, journalist, mayor of Toledo, Ohio, ambassador to Belgium, and author. Lived in Springfield from 1892 to January 1897 while serving as reporter for Chicago Herald and then working for Secretary of State during Gov. Altgeld's administration.

Religion 

 The Rt. Reverend Albert Arthur Chambers, seventh Bishop of Springfield
 Kevin Vann, bishop of the Roman Catholic Diocese of Orange

Academics 
 Nan Dieter-Conklin, radio astronomer
 Robert Fitzgerald, Harvard poetry professor
 William H. Luers, diplomat, Metropolitan Museum of Art president, Columbia University professor
 Seth Barnes Nicholson, astronomer
 Susan Nolen-Hoeksema, Yale psychology professor
 Raymond E. Zirkle (1902-1988), radiation chemist, a member of the Manhattan Project

Sports

Baseball 

 Al Barlick, Hall of Fame baseball umpire
 Ed Barrow, was an American manager and front office executive in Major League Baseball. He served as business manager (de facto general manager) of the New York Yankees from 1921 to 1939 and as team president from 1939 to 1945, and is credited with building the Yankee dynasty. Barrow was elected to the Baseball Hall of Fame in 1953.
 Don Erickson, pitcher for the Philadelphia Phillies 
 Roger Erickson, pitcher for the New York Yankees and Minnesota Twins 
 Jeff Fassero, pitcher for nine MLB teams (1991–2006) 
 Rose Folder, pitcher in the All-American Girls Professional Baseball League
 Tim Hulett, third baseman for the Chicago White Sox, Baltimore Orioles, and St. Louis Cardinals; born in Springfield 
 Tug Hulett, second baseman for the Seattle Mariners, Kansas City Royals, and Philadelphia Phillies; son of Tim Hulett; born in Springfield
 Bob Kinsella, outfielder for the New York Giants 
 Justin Knoedler, catcher for the San Francisco Giants 
 Ryan O'Malley, pitcher for the Chicago Cubs 
 Robin Roberts, pitcher and member of the Baseball Hall of Fame 
 Billy Rogell, shortstop for the Boston Red Sox, Detroit Tigers and Chicago Cubs 
 Johnny Schaive, infielder for the Washington Senators 
 Dick Schofield, shortstop for the California Angels, New York Mets, Toronto Blue Jays and Los Angeles Dodgers; son of Ducky Schofield 
 Ducky Schofield, infielder for nine MLB teams 
 Kevin Seitzer, former third baseman for the Kansas City Royals, Milwaukee Brewers, Oakland Athletics, and the Cleveland Indians and is currently the hitting coach for the Atlanta Braves. 
 Allan Simpson, pitcher for the Cincinnati Reds, Colorado Rockies and Milwaukee Brewers
 Art Sunday, outfielder for the Brooklyn Ward's Wonders 
 Lou Sylvester, outfielder for the Cincinnati Outlaw Reds, Cincinnati Red Stockings, Louisville Colonels and St. Louis Browns 
 Betty Wanless, infielder for the Grand Rapids Chicks and South Bend Blue Sox (AAGPBL) 
 Eric Weaver, pitcher for the Los Angeles Dodgers, Seattle Mariners and Anaheim Angels 
 Jayson Werth, outfielder for the Toronto Blue Jays, Los Angeles Dodgers, Philadelphia Phillies and Washington Nationals 
 Helen Westerman, catcher for the Kenosha Comets (AAGPBL) 
 Roy Wise, pitcher for the Pittsburgh Pirates
 Brad Ziegler, pitcher for the Miami Marlins

Basketball 

 Kevin Gamble, shooting guard and small forward for Boston Celtics and Sacramento Kings.
 Andre Iguodala, four-time NBA champion player for Golden State Warriors, MVP of 2015 NBA Finals
 Dave Robisch, forward/center in the ABA and NBA

Football 
 John Kidd, NFL punter 1984-98
 Ray Ramsey, aka "Rocket" Ramsey, defensive back for Chicago Cardinals (1950–1953); also had a brief professional basketball career
 Joey Sternaman, quarterback for Illinois and 1920s pro football teams including Chicago Bears
 Bob Trumpy, tight end for Cincinnati Bengals (1968–1977)
 Otto Stowe, wide receiver for Miami Dolphins 1972
 Malik Turner, wide receiver for Dallas Cowboys (2018–Present)

Mixed Martial Arts 
 Matt Mitrione, professional mixed martial artist formerly competing in the UFC, and now competes in Bellator was born and grew up in Springfield

Motorsports 
 Tim Wilkerson, NHRA funny car driver

Tennis 
 George Lott, five-time U.S. Open doubles champion, member of International Tennis Hall of Fame; born in Springfield

U.S. Olympic medal winners 
 Dick Boushka, Gold Medal, Basketball, 1956
 Kelci Bryant, Silver Medal, Diving, 2012
 Steve Christoff, Gold Medal, Hockey, 1980, Miracle on Ice at Lake Placid
 Sarah Glaser, Silver Medal, Sailing, 2000
 Gracie Gold, Bronze Medal, Figure Skating, 2014
 Ryan Held, Gold Medal, Men's 4X100-meter freestyle relay team, 2016
 Will Simpson, Gold Medal, Equestrian, 2008

Writers 
 James Hollis, Jungian analyst, writer and public speaker

References

 

Springfield
Springfield